Rudnichny (masculine), Rudnichnaya (feminine), or Rudnichnoye (neuter) is the name of several inhabited localities in Russia which have a mixture of settings.

Urban localities
Rudnichny, Kemerovo Oblast, an urban-type settlement under the administrative jurisdiction of the city of oblast significance of Anzhero-Sudzhensk, Kemerovo Oblast
Rudnichny, Kirov Oblast, an urban-type settlement in Verkhnekamsky District, Kirov Oblast

Rural localities
Rudnichny, Sverdlovsk Oblast, a former urban-type settlement in Sverdlovsk Oblast, Russia; since 2004—a rural locality

Abolished inhabited localities
Rudnichny, a former urban-type settlement in Perm Oblast; since 2004—a part of the town of Kizel

References